John Croker (21 October 1670 – 21 March 1741), born in Saxony and known in his youth as Johann Crocker, was a master jeweller who migrated to London, where he became a medallist and engraved dies for English and later British coins and medals.

For most of his adult life Croker worked in England, serving provincial mints as well as that at the Tower of London. For some seven years he engraved the die stamps for the coins of King William III and Queen Anne before becoming Chief Engraver to the Royal Mint, a position he held from 1705 until his death. He worked closely with the head of the Mint, the famous scientist Isaac Newton.

Life
Crocker was born at Dresden in 1670, the son of a cabinet-maker to John George II, Elector of Saxony, by his marriage to Rosina Frauenlaub. His father died while he was still a small boy, and he was apprenticed to his godfather, a goldsmith and jeweller in Dresden. After completing his apprenticeship, Crocker migrated first to the Netherlands and then in 1691 to England. There, he was employed by a jeweller and worked as a medallist, anglicizing his name to "John Croker". In 1697, he became one of the assistants to the chief engraver of the Royal Mint, Henry Harris. After Harris died in 1704, Croker petitioned Lord Godolphin, Lord High Treasurer of England, to succeed Harris in the position, stating that he had 

The officers of the Mint recommended Croker, and on 7 April 1705 he was chosen chief engraver. In the same year he married a Miss or Mrs Franklin, and they had one daughter, who died in childhood.

Shortly after his appointment at the Mint, Croker received confirmation of his right to issue medals on his own account, which was seen as a means of maintaining his engraving skills. The medal pictured (signed "I. C.", not "J. C.", as the inscription is in Latin) commemorates the Act of Grace of 1717, by which hundreds of Jacobites were freed almost two years after the Jacobite rising of 1715. Struck in silver as well as in bronze, on the obverse is the head of King George I, on the reverse the winged figure of Clemency surrounded by the words "CLEMENTIA AVGVSTI". In her left hand is an olive branch, in her right hand is a caduceus with which she touches the head of a fleeing snake, representing Rebellion.

Almost all of the dies for the coins of Queen Anne and King George I were engraved by Croker, and, until 1740, many for those of George II. He was also the creator of a large number of medals. In 1729 the Master of the Mint admitted, with some apprehension, that Croker was then "the only man now living who has hitherto made Puncheons for the Head on the Coin", and recommended the appointment of an assistant, John Sigismund Tanner, then aged only 24.

Croker's wife died in 1735, but he had good health and eyesight until his last two years. Although ailing, he still did some engraving work and liked to read in his spare time. He died on 21 March 1741 and was succeeded by his assistant, Tanner.

Medals

Croker's principal medals are as follows:

State of Britain after Peace of Ryswick, 1697
Accession, 1702
Coronation, 1702 (official medal)
Anne and Prince George of Denmark, 1702
Expedition to Vigo Bay 1702, view of Vigo harbour
Capitulation of Towns on the Meuse, 1702
Cities captured by Marlborough, 1703
Queen Anne's Bounty, 1704
Battle of Blenheim, 1704
Capture of Gibraltar, 1704
Barcelona relieved, 1706
Battle of Ramillies, 1706
Union of England and Scotland, 1707
Battle of Oudenarde, 1708
Capture of Sardinia and Minorca, 1708
Citadel of Lille taken, 1708
City of Tournay taken, 1709
Battle of Malplaquet, 1709
Douay taken, 1710
Battle of Almenara, 1710
The French lines passed, and Bouchain taken, 1711
Peace of Utrecht, 1713
Medallic portrait of Queen Anne
Arrival of George in England, 1714
Entry into London, 1714
Coronation, 1714 (official medal)
Battle of Sheriffmuir, 1715
Preston taken, 1715
Act of Grace, 1717 (pictured)
Treaty of Passarowitz, 1718
Naval Action off Cape Passaro, 1718
Caroline, Princess of Wales, 1718
Order of the Bath revived, 1725
Sir Isaac Newton, 1726
Coronation of George II, 1727 (official medal)
Queen Caroline, Coronation, 1727 (official medal)
Second Treaty of Vienna, 1731
Medal of the Royal Family, 1732, obverse only; reverse is by J. S. Tanner

Notes

External links

Medals by John Croker at National Museums Scotland online collections

1670 births
1741 deaths
British medallists
German emigrants to England
German medallists
Artists from Dresden
18th-century English male artists